';;Litoporus pakitza';; is a cellar spider species found in Peru.

See also 
 List of Pholcidae species

Spiders of South America
Pholcidae
Spiders described in 2000